The Odintsovo constituency (No.122) is a Russian legislative constituency in Moscow Oblast. The constituency covers southwestern Moscow Oblast. Until 2007 the constituency was non-contingent and had two exclaves: Vidnoye and Baikonur.

Members elected

Election results

1993

|-
! colspan=2 style="background-color:#E9E9E9;text-align:left;vertical-align:top;" |Candidate
! style="background-color:#E9E9E9;text-align:left;vertical-align:top;" |Party
! style="background-color:#E9E9E9;text-align:right;" |Votes
! style="background-color:#E9E9E9;text-align:right;" |%
|-
|style="background-color:"|
|align=left|Vladimir Lukin
|align=left|Yavlinsky–Boldyrev–Lukin
|
|16.18%
|-
|style="background-color:#0085BE"|
|align=left|Andrey Belogurov
|align=left|Choice of Russia
| -
|10.20%
|-
| colspan="5" style="background-color:#E9E9E9;"|
|- style="font-weight:bold"
| colspan="3" style="text-align:left;" | Total
| 
| 100%
|-
| colspan="5" style="background-color:#E9E9E9;"|
|- style="font-weight:bold"
| colspan="4" |Source:
|
|}

1995

|-
! colspan=2 style="background-color:#E9E9E9;text-align:left;vertical-align:top;" |Candidate
! style="background-color:#E9E9E9;text-align:left;vertical-align:top;" |Party
! style="background-color:#E9E9E9;text-align:right;" |Votes
! style="background-color:#E9E9E9;text-align:right;" |%
|-
|style="background-color:"|
|align=left|Yevgeny Sobakin
|align=left|Yabloko
|
|17.76%
|-
|style="background-color:"|
|align=left|Yury Gusev
|align=left|Independent
|
|9.86%
|-
|style="background-color:"|
|align=left|Viktor Chibisov
|align=left|Independent
|
|9.77%
|-
|style="background-color:#D50000"|
|align=left|Vitaly Lysov
|align=left|Communists and Working Russia - for the Soviet Union
|
|8.99%
|-
|style="background-color:"|
|align=left|Viktor Alksnis
|align=left|Independent
|
|8.54%
|-
|style="background-color:"|
|align=left|Vyacheslav Moslakov
|align=left|Independent
|
|7.43%
|-
|style="background-color:#1C1A0D"|
|align=left|Aleksey Mikhaylov
|align=left|Forward, Russia!
|
|4.23%
|-
|style="background-color:#3A46CE"|
|align=left|Dmitry Valigursky
|align=left|Democratic Choice of Russia – United Democrats
|
|4.19%
|-
|style="background-color:"|
|align=left|Aleksey Mitrofanov
|align=left|Liberal Democratic Party
|
|3.86%
|-
|style="background-color:#2C299A"|
|align=left|Nikolay Nikolayev
|align=left|Congress of Russian Communities
|
|3.77%
|-
|style="background-color:#A8A821"|
|align=left|Anatoly Larin
|align=left|Stable Russia
|
|2.41%
|-
|style="background-color:#000000"|
|colspan=2 |against all
|
|16.67%
|-
| colspan="5" style="background-color:#E9E9E9;"|
|- style="font-weight:bold"
| colspan="3" style="text-align:left;" | Total
| 
| 100%
|-
| colspan="5" style="background-color:#E9E9E9;"|
|- style="font-weight:bold"
| colspan="4" |Source:
|
|}

1999
A by-election was scheduled after Against all line received the most votes.

|-
! colspan=2 style="background-color:#E9E9E9;text-align:left;vertical-align:top;" |Candidate
! style="background-color:#E9E9E9;text-align:left;vertical-align:top;" |Party
! style="background-color:#E9E9E9;text-align:right;" |Votes
! style="background-color:#E9E9E9;text-align:right;" |%
|-
|style="background-color:"|
|align=left|Yevgeny Sobakin (incumbent)
|align=left|Yabloko
|
|16.44%
|-
|style="background-color:"|
|align=left|Viktor Alksnis
|align=left|Russian All-People's Union
|
|16.31%
|-
|style="background-color:"|
|align=left|Vitaly Lysov
|align=left|Communist Party
|
|7.98%
|-
|style="background-color:"|
|align=left|Vasily Popov
|align=left|Unity
|
|6.95%
|-
|style="background-color:"|
|align=left|Viktor Averin
|align=left|Independent
|
|5.57%
|-
|style="background-color:#F1043D"|
|align=left|Tatyana Andreyeva
|align=left|Socialist Party
|
|3.09%
|-
|style="background-color:"|
|align=left|Aleksandr Gornov
|align=left|Liberal Democratic Party
|
|2.90%
|-
|style="background:#1042A5"| 
|align=left|Fyodor Burlatsky
|align=left|Union of Right Forces
|
|2.88%
|-
|style="background-color:"|
|align=left|Aleksandr Galkin
|align=left|Our Home – Russia
|
|2.43%
|-
|style="background-color:"|
|align=left|Viktor Shchekochikhin
|align=left|Independent
|
|2.36%
|-
|style="background-color:"|
|align=left|Andrey Brezhnev
|align=left|Independent
|
|2.35%
|-
|style="background-color:#FCCA19"|
|align=left|Viktor Pronin
|align=left|Congress of Russian Communities-Yury Boldyrev Movement
|
|1.46%
|-
|style="background-color:#C21022"|
|align=left|Yevgeny Mititel
|align=left|Party of Pensioners
|
|1.34%
|-
|style="background-color:"|
|align=left|Aleksandr Malov
|align=left|Independent
|
|1.17%
|-
|style="background-color:#00542A"|
|align=left|Vladimir Miloserdov
|align=left|Russian Party
|
|1.15%
|-
|style="background-color:"|
|align=left|Yevgeny Milashchenko
|align=left|Independent
|
|0.80%
|-
|style="background-color:#084284"|
|align=left|Oleg Savin
|align=left|Spiritual Heritage
|
|0.69%
|-
|style="background-color:"|
|align=left|Aleksandr Shapovalov
|align=left|Independent
|
|0.60%
|-
|style="background-color:"|
|align=left|Igor Obukhov
|align=left|Independent
|
|0.42%
|-
|style="background-color:#000000"|
|colspan=2 |against all
|
|20.07%
|-
| colspan="5" style="background-color:#E9E9E9;"|
|- style="font-weight:bold"
| colspan="3" style="text-align:left;" | Total
| 
| 100%
|-
| colspan="5" style="background-color:#E9E9E9;"|
|- style="font-weight:bold"
| colspan="4" |Source:
|
|}

2000

|-
! colspan=2 style="background-color:#E9E9E9;text-align:left;vertical-align:top;" |Candidate
! style="background-color:#E9E9E9;text-align:left;vertical-align:top;" |Party
! style="background-color:#E9E9E9;text-align:right;" |Votes
! style="background-color:#E9E9E9;text-align:right;" |%
|-
|style="background-color:"|
|align=left|Viktor Alksnis
|align=left|Independent
|
|23.76%
|-
|style="background-color:"|
|align=left|Yevgeny Sobakin
|align=left|Independent
|
|19.36%
|-
|style="background-color:"|
|align=left|Viktor Averin
|align=left|Independent
|
|10.74%
|-
|style="background-color:"|
|align=left|Vladimir Ivanov
|align=left|Independent
|
|4.94%
|-
|style="background-color:"|
|align=left|Nikolay Babkin
|align=left|Independent
|
|3.28%
|-
|style="background-color:"|
|align=left|Tatyana Igumenova
|align=left|Independent
|
|3.04%
|-
|style="background-color:"|
|align=left|Nikolay Moskovchenko
|align=left|Independent
|
|2.25%
|-
|style="background-color:"|
|align=left|Vladimir Miloserdov
|align=left|Independent
|
|1.63%
|-
|style="background-color:"|
|align=left|Gennady Ryzhenko
|align=left|Independent
|
|1.59%
|-
|style="background-color:"|
|align=left|Gennady Benov
|align=left|Independent
|
|1.57%
|-
|style="background-color:"|
|align=left|Gennady Krylov
|align=left|Independent
|
|1.46%
|-
|style="background-color:"|
|align=left|Yury Kara
|align=left|Independent
|
|1.26%
|-
|style="background-color:"|
|align=left|Vladimir Vakhaniya
|align=left|Independent
|
|1.16%
|-
|style="background-color:"|
|align=left|Andrey Kashelkin
|align=left|Independent
|
|0.73%
|-
|style="background-color:"|
|align=left|Yevgeny Tarlo
|align=left|Independent
|
|0.64%
|-
|style="background-color:"|
|align=left|Sergey Pavlyuk
|align=left|Independent
|
|0.63%
|-
|style="background-color:"|
|align=left|Zagalav Nurudinov
|align=left|Independent
|
|0.50%
|-
|style="background-color:#000000"|
|colspan=2 |against all
|
|18.55%
|-
| colspan="5" style="background-color:#E9E9E9;"|
|- style="font-weight:bold"
| colspan="3" style="text-align:left;" | Total
| 
| 100%
|-
| colspan="5" style="background-color:#E9E9E9;"|
|- style="font-weight:bold"
| colspan="4" |Source:
|
|}

2003

|-
! colspan=2 style="background-color:#E9E9E9;text-align:left;vertical-align:top;" |Candidate
! style="background-color:#E9E9E9;text-align:left;vertical-align:top;" |Party
! style="background-color:#E9E9E9;text-align:right;" |Votes
! style="background-color:#E9E9E9;text-align:right;" |%
|-
|style="background-color:#7C73CC"|
|align=left|Viktor Alksnis (incumbent)
|align=left|Great Russia – Eurasian Union
|
|24.47%
|-
|style="background-color:"|
|align=left|Nikolay Kovalyov
|align=left|United Russia
|
|20.42%
|-
|style="background-color:"|
|align=left|Vladimir Lukin
|align=left|Yabloko
|
|12.74%
|-
|style="background-color:#00A1FF"|
|align=left|Yevgeny Sobakin
|align=left|Party of Russia's Rebirth-Russian Party of Life
|
|6.55%
|-
|style="background-color:#164C8C"|
|align=left|Natalya Sokolkova
|align=left|United Russian Party Rus'
|
|4.81%
|-
|style="background-color:"|
|align=left|Yevgeny Tarasov
|align=left|Agrarian Party
|
|2.32%
|-
|style="background-color:"|
|align=left|Maksim Rokhmistrov
|align=left|Liberal Democratic Party
|
|2.23%
|-
|style="background-color:"|
|align=left|Vladimir Vakhaniya
|align=left|Independent
|
|1.83%
|-
|style="background-color:#14589F"|
|align=left|Vladimir Guzhva
|align=left|Development of Enterprise
|
|1.07%
|-
|style="background-color:"|
|align=left|Stanislav Sindrevich
|align=left|Independent
|
|0.57%
|-
|style="background-color:"|
|align=left|Igor Krutovykh
|align=left|Independent
|
|0.48%
|-
|style="background-color:"|
|align=left|Aleksey Volynets
|align=left|Independent
|
|0.48%
|-
|style="background-color:#000000"|
|colspan=2 |against all
|
|19.85%
|-
| colspan="5" style="background-color:#E9E9E9;"|
|- style="font-weight:bold"
| colspan="3" style="text-align:left;" | Total
| 
| 100%
|-
| colspan="5" style="background-color:#E9E9E9;"|
|- style="font-weight:bold"
| colspan="4" |Source:
|
|}

2016

|-
! colspan=2 style="background-color:#E9E9E9;text-align:left;vertical-align:top;" |Candidate
! style="background-color:#E9E9E9;text-align:left;vertical-align:top;" |Party
! style="background-color:#E9E9E9;text-align:right;" |Votes
! style="background-color:#E9E9E9;text-align:right;" |%
|-
|style="background-color: " |
|align=left|Oksana Pushkina
|align=left|United Russia
|
|45.02%
|-
|style="background-color:"|
|align=left|Vladimir Chuvilin
|align=left|Communist Party
|
|10.05%
|-
|style="background-color:"|
|align=left|Yury Spirin
|align=left|Liberal Democratic Party
|
|9.85%
|-
|style="background-color:"|
|align=left|Viktor Alksnis
|align=left|A Just Russia
|
|9.34%
|-
|style="background:"| 
|align=left|Sergey Artemov
|align=left|Communists of Russia
|
|5.63%
|-
|style="background-color:"|
|align=left|Sergey Astashov
|align=left|The Greens
|
|4.73%
|-
|style="background-color:"|
|align=left|Aleksey Korolev
|align=left|Rodina
|
|3.84%
|-
|style="background-color:"|
|align=left|Yaroslav Svyatoslavsky
|align=left|People's Freedom Party
|
|3.43%
|-
|style="background:"| 
|align=left|Vyacheslav Savinov
|align=left|Patriots of Russia
|
|2.41%
|-
|style="background:"| 
|align=left|Fyodor Tsekhmistrenko
|align=left|Civic Platform
|
|0.58%
|-
| colspan="5" style="background-color:#E9E9E9;"|
|- style="font-weight:bold"
| colspan="3" style="text-align:left;" | Total
| 
| 100%
|-
| colspan="5" style="background-color:#E9E9E9;"|
|- style="font-weight:bold"
| colspan="4" |Source:
|
|}

2021

|-
! colspan=2 style="background-color:#E9E9E9;text-align:left;vertical-align:top;" |Candidate
! style="background-color:#E9E9E9;text-align:left;vertical-align:top;" |Party
! style="background-color:#E9E9E9;text-align:right;" |Votes
! style="background-color:#E9E9E9;text-align:right;" |%
|-
|style="background-color:"|
|align=left|Denis Maydanov
|align=left|United Russia
|
|40.39%
|-
|style="background-color:"|
|align=left|Sergey Tenyayev
|align=left|Communist Party
|
|19.06%
|-
|style="background-color:"|
|align=left|Dmitry Parkhomenko
|align=left|Liberal Democratic Party
|
|6.51%
|-
|style="background:"| 
|align=left|Fyodor Stepanov
|align=left|Communists of Russia
|
|6.45%
|-
|style="background-color:"|
|align=left|Aleksandr Kumokhin
|align=left|A Just Russia — For Truth
|
|6.40%
|-
|style="background-color: " |
|align=left|Ruslan Kalimullin
|align=left|New People
|
|5.11%
|-
|style="background-color: "|
|align=left|Zhaudat Khanafiyev
|align=left|Party of Pensioners
|
|3.18%
|-
|style="background: "| 
|align=left|Aleksey Dulenkov
|align=left|Yabloko
|
|2.90%
|-
|style="background-color:"|
|align=left|Vladimir Sheryagin
|align=left|Rodina
|
|2.32%
|-
|style="background-color:"|
|align=left|Artur Sukyazyan
|align=left|The Greens
|
|1.86%
|-
| colspan="5" style="background-color:#E9E9E9;"|
|- style="font-weight:bold"
| colspan="3" style="text-align:left;" | Total
| 
| 100%
|-
| colspan="5" style="background-color:#E9E9E9;"|
|- style="font-weight:bold"
| colspan="4" |Source:
|
|}

Notes

References

Russian legislative constituencies
Politics of Moscow Oblast